The Airco DH.2 was a single-seat pusher biplane fighter aircraft which operated during the First World War. It was the second pusher design by aeronautical engineer Geoffrey de Havilland for Airco, based on his earlier DH.1 two-seater.

The development of pusher configuration fighters, such as the DH.2 and the F.E.2b enabled forward firing armament before the development of synchronisation gears such as that fitted to the German Fokker Eindecker monoplane fighter. The prototype DH.2 made its first flight in July 1915, but it was lost during the following month, on its service trials on the Western Front.

The DH.2 was introduced to frontline service in February 1916 and became the first effectively armed British single-seat fighter. It enabled Royal Flying Corps (RFC) pilots to counter the "Fokker Scourge" that had given the Germans the advantage during late 1915. It served in fighting and escort duties for almost two years, while numerous pilots became flying aces using the type. It became outclassed by newer German fighters, resulting in the DH.2's eventual withdrawal from first line service in France after RFC units completed the process of re-equipping with newer fighters, such as the Nieuport 17 and Airco DH.5, in June 1917.

Development
By the outbreak of the First World War, aeronautical engineer Geoffrey de Havilland was already an experienced aircraft designer, having been responsible for the experimental Royal Aircraft Factory F.E.1, Royal Aircraft Factory F.E.2  and Blériot Scout B.S.1, the B.S.1 being the fastest British aircraft of its day. In June 1914, de Havilland left the Royal Aircraft Factory for Airco, where he continued work on his own designs, the first being the Airco DH.1, which followed a similar formula to that of the F.E.2.

Early air combat over the Western Front indicated the need for a single-seat fighter with a forward-firing machine gun. At this point in time, there was no dominant approach to arming fighters, but a pusher configuration was one answer. As no means of firing forward through the propeller of a tractor aeroplane was yet available to the British, Geoffrey de Havilland designed the DH.2 as a scaled-down, single-seat development of the earlier two-seat DH.1. Aviation author J.M Bruce speculated that, had adequate synchronisation gear been available, de Havilland may have been less likely to pursue a pusher configuration.

While it is popularly viewed as a response to the emergence of Germany's Fokker Eindecker monoplane fighters, its development was not specifically targeted at the type, having commenced prior to the Eindecker's arrival. The first prototype DH.2 performed its first flight in July 1915. Following the completion of its manufacturing trials, on 26 July 1915, the prototype was dispatched to France for operational evaluation, but was lost over the Western Front and was captured by the Germans.

Despite the prototype's premature loss, the DH.2 was ordered into quantity manufacture. The production aircraft was generally similar to the prototype with the only major alterations being a fuel system and a revised gun mounting arrangement. Deliveries of the DH.2 commenced during the latter half of 1915 and a handful of aircraft were reportedly operating in France prior to the year's end. A total of 453 DH.2s were produced by Airco.

Design

The Airco DH.2 was a compact two-bay pusher biplane fighter aircraft. It had a wooden airframe, which was wire-braced and covered by fabric across most areas, except for the nacelle nose and upper decking. Both the upper and lower wings had ailerons fitted. The upper ailerons were spring-loaded to automatically return to a neutral position when the controls were released. The upper part of the nose of the nacelle was cut away so that a machine gun could be mounted there. Unusually, the windshield was mounted on the machine gun rather than to the airframe.

The DH.2 was armed with a single  Lewis gun which was mounted on a flexible mount. Once pilots learned that the best method of achieving a kill was to aim the aircraft rather than the gun, it was fixed to fire forward, although this was met with skepticism by higher authorities until a quick-release clip was devised at the Squadron level. The clip was devised by Major Lanoe Hawker, who also improved the gunsights and added a ring sight and an "aiming off model" that helped the gunner allow for leading a target.

The majority of DH.2s were powered by the  Gnôme Monosoupape nine-cylinder, air-cooled rotary engine, however later models received the similarly configured but much improved  Le Rhône 9J engine. Some sources state that the Monosoupape was retained in the DH.2 design despite a tendency to shed cylinders midair and a single DH.2 was fitted experimentally with a Le Rhône 9J. In addition to the variety of engines used, the fuel system also differed between individual aircraft. Typically, a gravity-fed fuel tank was used, but it could be located on the upper wing central section, or either above or below the port side upper wing.

Operational service

After evaluation at Hendon on 22 June 1915, the first DH.2 arrived in France for operational trials with No. 5 RFC Squadron but was shot down and its pilot killed during early August 1915. This aircraft was recovered and repaired by the Germans. The first squadron equipped with the DH.2, and the first RFC squadron completely equipped with single-seat fighters, No. 24 Squadron RFC, arrived in France early February 1916.

The DH.2 eventually equipped seven fighter squadrons on the Western Front and proved more than a match for the Fokker Eindecker and the first DH.2 victory over an Eindecker may have been on 2 April 1916. DH.2s were heavily involved in the Battle of the Somme with No. 24 Squadron engaging in 774 combats and claiming 44 enemy machines. Service training for pilots in the RFC was poor, and the DH.2 initially had a high accident rate, supposedly gaining the nickname "The Spinning Incinerator", but as familiarity with the type improved, it was recognised as being maneuverable and relatively easy to fly.

The limited ammunition supply of the original gun installation proved to be inadequate. Although officially discouraged, pilots experimented with different gun arrangements, including a fixed twin-gun configuration. Furthermore, the original gun mounting was criticised for being loose and unstable, and it obstructed the stick when elevated. DH.2s were routinely flown with the guns fixed into position.

The arrival at the front of more powerful German tractor biplane fighters such as the Halberstadt D.II and the Albatros D.I, in late 1916, meant that the DH.2 was outclassed in turn. It remained in first line service until June 1917 in France, until No. 24 and No. 32 Squadron RFC reequipped with Airco DH.5s, and a few remained in service in Macedonia including "A" Flight of No. 47 Squadron and a joint R.F.C. / R.N.A.S. fighter squadron, and with "X" Flight, in Palestine until late 1917. By then, it was dangerously obsolete as a fighter. The DH.2 was then used as an advanced trainer and for other secondary tasks, with the last recorded use of a DH.2 being a single example flying at RAF Turnhouse in January 1919.

Ace pilots
Distinguished pilots of the DH.2 included Victoria Cross recipient Lanoe Hawker (seven victories, though none in the DH.2), who was the first commander of No. 24 Squadron. The commander of No. 32 Squadron, Lionel Rees was awarded the Victoria Cross after flying the D.H.2 for a solo attack on a formation of ten German two-seaters on 1 July 1916, destroying two. James McCudden became an ace in DH.2s and would become the British Empire's fourth-ranking ace of the war. German ace and tactician Oswald Boelcke was killed during a dogfight with No. 24 Squadron DH.2s due to a collision with one of his own wingmen. Fourteen aces scored five or more aerial victories using the DH.2 and many also went on to further success in later types. Eight pilots scored all of their victories in the DH-2, including Harry Wood, Sidney Cowan, Hubert Jones, William Curphey, Maxmillian Mare-Montembault, Patrick Anthony Langan-Byrne, Eric Pashley and Selden Long. Lanoe George Hawker V.C., D.S.O., and commanding officer of No. 24 Squadron flying a DH. 2 was shot down by Manfred von Richthofen flying an Albatros D.II.

Reproductions

No original DH.2s exist. In 1970, Walter M. Redfern from Seattle, Washington built a replica DH.2 called the Redfern DH-2, powered by a Kinner  engine. Redfern subsequently sold plans to home builders, and several of these replicas are flying. Redfern's original replica is now displayed at the Omaka Aviation Heritage Centre in Blenheim, New Zealand.

Operators

Royal Flying Corps (Most units operated the DH.2 alongside other types)
No. 5 Squadron RFC
No. 11 Squadron RFC
No. 17 Squadron RFC
No. 18 Squadron RFC
No. 24 Squadron RFC
No. 29 Squadron RFC
No. 32 Squadron RFC
No. 41 Squadron RFC
No. 47 Squadron RFC
No. 111 Squadron RFC

Specifications (DH.2)

See also

References

Citations

Bibliography
 Bruce, J.M. Warplanes of the First World War - Fighters Volume One. London: MacDonald & Co., 1965.
 Bruce, J.M. Aircraft Profile No. 91: The de Havilland D.H.2. Profile Publications Ltd, 1966.
 Bruce, J. M. The Aeroplanes of the Royal Flying Corps (Military Wing). London: Putnam, 1982. 
 Cheesman, E.F., ed. Fighter Aircraft of the 1914-1918 War. Herts, UK: Harleyford, 1960.
 Funderburk, Thomas R. The Fighters: The Men and Machines of the First Air War. New York: Grosset & Dunlap, 1962.
 Goulding, James. Interceptor: RAF Single Seat Multi-Gun Fighters. London: Ian Allan Ltd., 1986. .
 
 Guttman, Jon. Pusher Aces of World War 1. Jon Guttman. Osprey Pub Co, 2009. , .
 Jackson, A.J. De Havilland Aircraft since 1909. London: Putnam, Third edition, 1987. .
 Mason, Francis K. The British Fighter since 1912. Annapolis, Maryland: Naval Institute Press, 1992. .
 Miller, James F. "DH 2 vs Albatros D I/D II - Western Front 1916 (Osprey Duel ; 42)". Oxford, UK: Osprey Publishing, 2012. .
 Munson, Kenneth. Fighters Attack and Training Aircraft 1914-1919. New York: Macmillan, 1968.
 Raleigh, Walter. The War In The Air: Being the Story of the part played in the Great War by the Royal Air Force, Vol I. Oxford, UK: Clarendon Press, First edition 1922, 2002 (reprint). .
 Sharpe, Michael. Biplanes, Triplanes, and Seaplanes. London: Friedman/Fairfax Books, 2000. .

External links
 

DH.002
1910s British fighter aircraft
Single-engined pusher aircraft
Biplanes
Rotary-engined aircraft
Military aircraft of World War I
Aircraft first flown in 1915